Tropaeolum brachyceras is a species of perennial plant in the Tropaeolaceae family. It is endemic to mountainous regions of Chile.

References

brachyceras
Flora of Chile